Urú may refer to:

 Urú, the Spanish name for the spot-winged wood quail
 Urú or eclipsis, a type of initial consonant mutation in the Irish language

See also 
 Uru (disambiguation)
 Urús, a village in Girona, Catalonia, Spain